Shelby County Courthouse may refer to:

 Shelby County Courthouse (Illinois), Shelbyville, Illinois
 Shelby County Courthouse (Indiana), Shelbyville, Indiana
 Shelby County Courthouse (Iowa), Harlan, Iowa
 Shelby County Courthouse (Ohio), Sidney, Ohio
 Shelby County Courthouse (Tennessee), Memphis, Tennessee
 Shelby County Courthouse (Texas), Center, Texas, listed on the National Register of Historic Places